The Women's 400 metres Hurdles at the 1988 Summer Olympics in Seoul, South Korea had an entry list of 35 competitors, with five qualifying heats and two semifinals (16) before the final (8) took place on Wednesday September 28, 1988.

In 1987, the former world record holder Sabine Busch of the GDR, improved her best to 53.24 seconds, before going on to win the World Championship title in Rome in 53.62 secs, with Debbie Flintoff-King of Australia second, GDR team-mate Cornelia Ullrich third, and Jamaica's Sandra Farmer fourth. Both Ullrich and Farmer, who was now competing for the USA as Sandra Farmer-Patrick, failed to make it to Seoul. Farmer-Patrick was disqualified in her semifinal at the US Olympic trials for a lane infringement, while Ullrich missed out on a spot on the GDR Olympic team to Ellen Fiedler and Susanne Losch.

In Seoul, Fiedler set a new Olympic record in the heats, running 54.58 secs. Flintoff-King then further improved the Olympic record to 54.00 in the first semifinal, finishing just ahead of the little-known Soviet Tatyana Ledovskaya, who ran 54.01. Fiedler won the second semifinal in 54.28, with world champion Busch fourth. 

In the final, Ledovskaya (lane 3) made the fastest start and still held a narrow lead at the eighth hurdle, with Fiedler (lane 6) second, Busch (lane 7) third and Flintoff-King (lane 5) back in fifth. By the tenth hurdle, Ledovskaya still led from Fiedler, with Flintoff-King closing and moving into third ahead of Bush. Flintoff-King continued to close on the run-in and passed Ledovskaya in the final stride, winning in the new Olympic record time of 53.17, to move to second on the world all-time list. Ledovskaya took the silver in 53.18, with Fiedler holding off Busch for the bronze, running 53.63 to Busch's 53.69. With six of the top seven running personal bests, the Seoul final rewrote the all-time list, with fifth-placed Sally Gunnell (54.03) and sixth-placed Gudrun Abt (54.04), moving to number 10 and 11 on the all-time list.

Medalists

Records
These were the standing World and Olympic records (in seconds) prior to the 1988 Summer Olympics.

The following Olympic records were set during this competition.

Final

Semi finals

Qualifying heats

See also
 1986 Women's European Championships 400m Hurdles (Stuttgart)
 1987 Women's World Championships 400m Hurdles (Rome)
 1990 Women's European Championships 400m Hurdles (Split)
 1991 Women's World Championships 400m Hurdles (Tokyo)

References

External links
  Official Report

 1
400 metres hurdles at the Olympics
1988 in women's athletics
Women's events at the 1988 Summer Olympics